Thompsons Bus Service is an Australian operator of bus services in the northern suburbs of Brisbane. It operates eight services under contract to the Queensland Government under the Translink banner.

History
On 1 September 1979 Geoff Thompson purchased Lawnton Bus Service from Neville Story. On 15 January 1990 Pine River Bus Service was purchased from Lourie Fischer on 15 January 1990, with the combined business renamed Thompson's.

Routes

Fleet
As at December 2022, the fleet consists of 73 buses and coaches. A long time Leyland purchaser, since 2006 it has purchased Denning Manufacturing buses.

References

Bus companies of Queensland
Public transport in Brisbane
Translink (Queensland)